Emir Muratović (born 6 November 1996) is a Bosnian swimmer. He competed in the men's 50 metre freestyle and the men's 100 metre freestyle at the 2020 Summer Olympics.

References

External links
 

1996 births
Living people
Bosnia and Herzegovina male swimmers
Bosnia and Herzegovina male freestyle swimmers
Olympic swimmers of Bosnia and Herzegovina
Swimmers at the 2020 Summer Olympics
Sportspeople from Tuzla